The 1994 Newham London Borough Council election to the Newham London Borough Council was held on 5 May 1994. The whole council was up for election. Turnout was 37.2%. Labour maintained its overwhelming majority.

Election Result

|}

Background
A total of 177 candidates stood in the election for the 60 seats being contested across 24 wards. Candidates included a full slate from the Labour Party, whilst the Conservative Party ran 57 candidates whilst the Liberal Democrats ran 30 candidates. Other candidates running were 11 Greens, 7 Independent Liberal Democrats, 5 BNP and 7 Independents.

Results by ward

Beckton

Bemersyde

Canning Town & Grange

Castle

Central

Custom House & Silvertown

Forest Gate

Greatfield

Hudsons

Kensington

Little Ilford

Manor Park

Monega

New Town

Ordnance

Park

Plaistow

Plashet

St Stephens

South

Stratford

Upton

Wall End

West Ham

By-elections between 1994 and 1998

South

The by-election was called following the death of Cllr. Thomas A. Jenkinson.

Forest Gate

The by-election was called following the resignation of Cllr. Glynis A. Carpenter.

Central

The by-election was called following the resignation of Cllr. Christopher B. Allen.

Canning Town and Grange

The by-election was called following the resignation of Cllr. Dennis R. Horwood.

Little IIford

The by-election was called following the resignation of Cllr Stephen C. Timms.

South

The by-election was called following the death of Cllr. Theodore L. Etherden.

Ordnance

The by-election was called following the resignation of Cllr. Judith A. Jorsling.

References

1994
1994 London Borough council elections